Gyula Moór (11 August 1888 – 3 February 1950) was a Hungarian jurist, Professor, Member of Parliament and President of the Hungarian Academy of Sciences between 1945 and 1946.

Sources
 Szegedi egyetemi almanach: 1921–1995. Vol. I. (1996). Szeged, (ed. Rezső Mészáros). p. 53. 

1888 births
1950 deaths
People from Brașov
Hungarian Independence Party politicians
Members of the National Assembly of Hungary (1945–1947)
Members of the National Assembly of Hungary (1947–1949)
Hungarian jurists
Members of the Hungarian Academy of Sciences